Smartsheet is a software as a service (SaaS) offering for collaboration and work management, developed and marketed by Smartsheet Inc. It is used to assign tasks, track project progress, manage calendars, share documents, and manage other work, using a tabular user interface.

Features 
Smartsheet is used to collaborate on project timelines, documents, calendars, tasks, and other works. According to IDG, it is "part office productivity, part project management, part document sharing... [it] is trying to be the central hub for how people work." Smartsheet  competes with Microsoft Project. It combines some of the functionality of Microsoft Project, Excel, Access and SharePoint.

According to Forbes, Smartsheet has "a relatively simple" user interface. The interface centers on "smartsheets," which are similar to spreadsheets typically found in Microsoft Excel. Each smartsheet can have its rows expanded or collapsed to see individual tasks or large-scale project progress respectively. Tasks can be sorted by deadline, priority or the person assigned to them. If a spreadsheet contains dates, Smartsheet creates a calendar view.

Each row in a smartsheet may have files attached to it, emails stored within it, and a discussion board associated with it. When a new smartsheet is created, notifications are pushed out to staff to populate its rows and columns. As information is updated, other smartsheets tracking the same task, project or data-point are updated automatically. The service also has alerts for when a task deadline is coming up, and keeps track of document versions.

Smartsheet can import data from Microsoft Office or Google applications. It integrates with Salesforce.com, Dropbox and Amazon Web Services. There is also a Smartsheet mobile app for Android and iOS operating systems. The service is offered on a subscription basis with no free tiers.

History 

Smartsheet was developed by Smartsheet Inc, in 2005 and introduced to the public in 2006. According to the company's co-founder, Brent Frei, initial adoption was slow because the offering was too difficult to use. At the end of its first year, it had 10,000 users. The company began making changes to the SmartSheet in 2008, eventually cutting 60 percent of its features for the purpose of making it more user-friendly. Following the 2010 launch of the redesign, the adoption grew to 1 million users at 20,000 organizations by 2012.

Integration with Office 365 and Microsoft Azure were added in 2014. In August of that year, version 2.0 of the Smartsheet iOS app was introduced. The spreadsheet-like user interface, which was part of the web service, was introduced to the iOS app in this version; the developers had not been able to build this feature in the mobile version before. In October 2014, the Account Map tool was introduced, which uses an algorithm to visualize the flow of work across groups of employees. 

In 2015, Smartsheet started introducing closer integrations with Microsoft Office products, following the changes Microsoft had made in their products to work better with third-party software. In January 2015, Smartsheet added support for Azure Active Directory, Microsoft's cloud-based directory service that allowed users to log into products like Excel and Smartsheet with the same login. This allowed users to make changes to smartsheets directly from Microsoft Outlook. In 2016, Smartsheet introduced Sights, a configurable dashboard that shows metrics such as how a team is performing against key performance indicators.

In November 2021, McLaren announced a partnership deal with Smartsheet as the team's official technology partner at the 2021 São Paulo Grand Prix.

In 2022, Miro introduced an integration with Smartsheet.

References

Further reading

External links 
 

Cloud applications
Collaborative software
Project management software